Borisoglebsk (also Borisoglebsk East) is an air base in Voronezh Oblast, Russia located 6 km east of Borisoglebsk. It is a small military airfield.

The base is home to 160th Training Aviation Regiment which flies the Sukhoi Su-25 and Yakovlev Yak-130 of the 786th Aviation Training Centre for the Training of Flight Personnel.

From 1960 to 1971 the 478th Training Aviation Regiment, initially flying Ilyushin Il-12s and Il-14s, was stationed at the airfield. It moved in 1971 to Petrovsk in Saratov Oblast.

In October 1990 the 1080th Red Banner Aviation Centre for Retraining of Personnel named for V.P. Chkalov (1080 UATsPLS, :ru:Борисоглебское высшее военное авиационное училище лётчиков им. В. П. Чкалова) was activated at Borisoglebsk. It was an amalgamation of the 796th Center for Preparation of Officers for Fighter and Fighter-Bomber Aviation, and the Borisoglebsk Higher Military Aviation School of Pilots. The Centre was subordinated to the Air Forces of the Moscow Military District.

The 1080 UATsPLS had the following components in 1990:
160th Instructor Fighter Aviation Regiment (Borisoglebsk, Voronezh Oblast) with MiG-29 and MiG-21. In 1991 the 160 IIAP was equipped with 60 MiG-21 aircraft. In addition, the regiment had 25 MiG-29E in the early 1990s through at least 2003. 
186th Instructor Assault Aviation Regiment (Buturlinovka, Voronezh Oblast) with Su-25
281st Instructor Fighter Aviation Regiment (Totskoye, Orenburg Oblast) with MiG-23
343rd Instructor Fighter Aviation Regiment (Sennoy, Saratov Oblast) with MiG-29

Holm's information reports that the 1080 UATsPLS was disbanded in 1997 and the awards (presumably the Order of the Red Banner and the title 'in the name of V.P. Chkalov') were transferred to the 4th Center for Combat Employment and Retraining of Crews VVS at Lipetsk. His information also suggests that the remnants remained as the Borisoglebsk Aviation Garrison, which was disbanded in 2000.

However, Google Earth high-resolution satellite imagery accessed in 2006 showed numerous Aero L-39 'Albatross' trainer aircraft, Su-25 'Frogfoot' and two Su-24 'Fencer' aircraft.

References

Soviet Air Force bases
Russian Air Force bases